Edouard Van Brandt (27 March 1911 – 21 February 1943) was a Belgian footballer. He played in two matches for the Belgium national football team in 1932.

References

External links
 

1911 births
1943 deaths
Belgian footballers
Belgium international footballers
Place of birth missing
Association footballers not categorized by position